First Lady of the Republic of Poland is an informal designation customarily applied to the wife of the president of the Republic of Poland (as so far all Polish presidents have been male). The First Lady does not hold a constitutional position and there are no political duties associated with the role. However, the first lady sometimes accompanies her husband on formal occasions such as state visits.

The current Polish first lady is Agata Kornhauser-Duda.

Second Republic (1918–1939)

Government in Exile (1939–1990)

Communist Poland/Polish People's Republic (1944–1989)

Third Republic (since 1989)

See also 
Helena Paderewska, wife of Ignacy Jan Paderewski

References

External links 
First Lady of Poland (in Polish)

Poland